David Brierley (12 December 1953 – 1 August 2009) was Archdeacon of Sudbury from 2006 to 2009.

Brierley was educated at the University of Bristol and ordained in 1978. After a curacy in Rochdale he held incumbencies in Eccles and Great Harwood. He was Canon Residentiary at Bradford Cathedral from 
2002 to 2004 and then Diocesan Missioner until his appointment as Archdeacon.

References

1953 births
2009 deaths
Alumni of the University of Bristol
Archdeacons of Sudbury